The  2010 Campeonato Argentino de Rugby   was won by the selection of Tucumàn that beat in the final the selection of Rosario.

The championship returned to be played on three levels.

"Campeonato"
Two pools of four teams The first two to semifinals.

The fourth of each pools played the remaining on their maximum levels, either the two winners of "ascenso".

Pool 1

Pool 2

Semifinals

Final 

Rosario: 1. Santiago Sodini, 2. Franco Manavella, 3. Jerónimo Negrotto, 4. Pablo Bouza (cap), 5. Aníbal Schiavo, 6. Galo Dellavedova, 7. Pablo Colacrai, 8. José Basso, 9. Pedro Escalante, 10. Mateo Escalante, 11. Juan Imhoff, 12. Alejo Fradua, 13. Nicolás Gatarello, 14. Pablo Iguri, 15. Román Miralles., sostituti:, 16. Matías Massafra, 17. Walter Alderete, 18. Manuel Baravalle, 19. Simón Boffelli, 20. Magin Moliné, 21. Federico Amelong, 22. Tomás Carrió.
  Tucumàn :1. Edgardo Herrera, 2. Juan Ávila, 3. Bruno Cuezzo, 4. Juan Pablo Lagarrigue, 5. Gabriel Pata Curello (c), 6. Antonio Ahualli de Chazal, 7. Agustín Guzmán, 8. Ignacio Haustein, 9. Diego Ternavasio, 10. Nicolás Sánchez, 11. Aníbal Terán, 12. Gabriel Ascárate, 13. Ezequiel Faralle, 14. Juan Manuel Ponce, 15. Lucas Barrera Oro, sostituti:, 16. Roberto Tejerizo, 17. Germán Araoz, 18. Patricio Jiménez, 19. Nicolás Centurión, 20. Luis Castillo, 21. Joaquín Romano, 22. Álvaro López González.

"Ascenso"

Pool 1 

  Mar del Plata to playout for promotion to "Ascenso"
 Entre Rios  to play-out to relegation in "Promocional"

Pool 2 

  Alto Valle  to playout for promotion to "Ascenso"
 Chubut  to play-out to relegation in "Promocional"

Promotion/relegation play-out
The winner of pools of "Ascenso" played for promotion to "Campeonato" with the last of the two pools of "Capeonato"

 Mar del Plata promoted to "Campeonato " 2011

 Santa Fe remain in "Campeonato " 2011

Promocional

Zone "North"

 
 Andina to "promotion Play-off"

Zone "South" 

, 

  Lagos del Sur topromotion play-off

Play Off 
Participate to this finals, the two winner of South and North zone anch the last two of each pools of "Ascenso"

  Entre Rios remain in  "Ascenso" 2011

  Chubut remain in  "Ascenso" 2011

External links 
 Campeonato Argentino su rugbyfun.com.ar
  Francesco Volpe, Paolo Pacitti (Author), Rugby 2011, GTE Gruppo Editorale (2010)

Campeonato Argentino de Rugby
Argentina
Campeonato